A colonist car (or emigrant car) was a type of railway passenger coach designed to provide inexpensive long-distant transportation for immigrants, mainly in North America. They were noted for very spartan accommodation.

History 
Colonist cars were a solution to the challenge of North American settlement in the mid and late 19th century which saw the growth of settlement areas in the western interior of the continent, thousands of miles from the seaports where most immigrants arrived. Colonist cars began in the 1840s as the cheapest form of transport for immigrants who could only afford basic fares. At first they provided only benches around the side of what were often boxcars which could be converted to grain cars for return trips to the east coast.

However by the 1880s, railways competing for immigrant traffic on longer routes to western North America developed specialized cars for immigrants providing simple sleeping berths and cooking facilities. Early examples were introduced by the Central Pacific Railroad in 1879. By 1885 the idea was matched by other western railway such as the Santa Fe,  the Union Pacific, the Northern Pacific, the Great Northern Railway and the Canadian Pacific Railway. The fleet of colonist cars at Canadian Pacific grew to include over a thousand cars, providing spartan sleeping accommodation to immigrants to Western Canada. These cars provided simple pull-down sleeping berths and kitchens where immigrant families could cook their own meals. Fares were very cheap. A family could cross Canada from Montreal for seven dollars but immigrants had to provide their own food and bedding. Blankets, pillows and food all cost extra. The Canadian Pacific eventually built a fleet of over a thousand colonist cars which played a major role in settling the Canadian West.

Rival Canadian Railways such as the Intercolonial Railway and later the Canadian Northern also built fleets of colonists cars in the peak years of immigration before World War I. However in the wake of immigration restrictions in the 1920s and a near-halt to immigration during the Great Depression, many colonist cars were converted to combine cars or work cars by the Canadian National Railway which inherited these fleets. They saw renewed use in World War II as troop cars and surviving colonist cars were heavily used in the post World War II boom in immigration. By the 1960s most colonist cars were worn out and were replaced by standard passenger cars as demand for immigrant trains from sea ports fell in the wake of increased travel by air.

Today, two Canadian Pacific Railway colonist cars are preserved in Canada at the Calgary Heritage Park in Calgary, Alberta. and at the West Coast Railway Association's museum in Squamish, British Columbia. Canadian National colonist cars are preserved at the Canada Science and Technology Museum in Ottawa, the Railway Museum of Eastern Ontario in Smiths Falls, Ontario and the New Brunswick Railway Museum in Hillsborough, New Brunswick. The Canadian Museum of Immigration at Pier 21 built a replica of a 1920s era colonist car complete with immigrant luggage and cooking stove as part of its 2015 expansion.

References 

Passenger railroad cars
History of immigration to Canada
History of immigration to the United States